The following is the complete filmography of American actor Burt Reynolds.

Film

Television

Video games

References

External links
 

Male actor filmographies
American filmographies